Whitford was an electoral district of the Legislative Assembly in the Australian state of Western Australia from 1977 to 1996.

History
The district was based in the northern suburbs of Perth and was created first contested at the 1977 state election. The seat was won by Liberal candidate Mick Nanovich, then member for the abolished Toodyay.

Whitford was captured by Labor candidate Pam Beggs, when Labor came to power at the 1983 state election. The seat was lost to Liberal candidate Rob Johnson at the 1993 state election, again coinciding with a change of government. Whitford was abolished ahead of the 1996 state election and Johnson successfully contested the replacement seat of Hillarys.

Members for Whitford

Election results

Whitford